Arica Himmel (born February 23, 2005) is an American actress, best known for her role as Rainbow "Bow" Johnson in the ABC comedy series, Mixed-ish.

Life and career
Himmel was born and raised in New York City. She is the daughter of Liberian singer-songwriter Zelma Davis and Brandon Himmel, an American realtor of German descent. Himmel has a sister, Zoe Himmel, who has also worked as an actress. She made her stage debut in the off-Broadway production of The Layover at the age of 11. In 2019, she made her film debut appearing in an supporting role opposite Judith Light in the comedy-drama film Before You Know It that premiered at the 2019 Sundance Film Festival.

In 2019, Himmel was cast as young Rainbow "Bow" Johnson, the leading character in the ABC comedy series Mixed-ish, a prequel spin-off of Black-ish.

Filmography

References

External links 
 

2005 births
Living people
African-American actresses
American television actresses
Actresses from New York City
21st-century American actresses
American people of Liberian descent
21st-century African-American women
21st-century African-American people